24: One Shot is the first graphic novel published that is based on the TV series 24. It was first released by IDW Publishing but has more recently featured as one of three graphic novels in a collection book known simply as 24 (The others being 24: Stories and 24: Midnight Sun). This book was published by Titan Books in 2005.

Credits

Writing: J. C. Vaughan & Mark L. Haynes
Artwork: Renato Guedes
Lettering: Robbie Robbins
Design: Robbie Robbins & Cindy Chapman
Editing: Jeff Mariotte

Synopsis

24: One Shot is set eighteen months before the events of Season 1. Jack Bauer is the protagonist of the TV series and is also the protagonist in this graphic novel which depicts his first day at the Los Angeles Counter Terrorist Unit. He has been assigned from the FBI by Division to become the new Director of Field Operations at the LA CTU. His first assignment is to personally protect Moira O'Neal, a beautiful but dangerous former terrorist previously affiliated with the Irish Republican Army who recently turned herself in after a sudden change of heart. O'Neal's former associates aren't happy about her sudden defection; they are not prepared to allow her to pass on information to the American government and have made their way onto American soil to find and kill Moira.

Main characters

Jack Bauer - New Director of Field Operations at LA CTU and hero of the story
Moira O'Neal - Former IRA terrorist who has lost heart in killing
Richard Walsh - Administrative Director at LA CTU
Nina Myers - Chief of Staff at LA CTU and current second-in-command
Tony Almeida - An intelligence agent at LA CTU and current third-in-command
Michael Donovan - chairman and CEO of Donovan Pharmaceuticals and IRA supporter
Tim McGinnis - One of Moira O'Neal's former associates looking for revenge

Explanation of the title

In the climax of the story Jack realises he has one bullet left in his gun to kill the last three terrorists with — Maggie, Megan and Tim. Jack cautiously sneaks up on Megan and Maggie, turns and fires Maggie's gun in her hands at Megan. As Jack and Maggie fall to the ground he manages to shoot her gun at her. Jack quickly moves to find Moira but discovers her with a gun pointed to her head in the hand of Tim McGinnis. McGinnis tells Jack to drop his weapon. Jack drops Maggie's gun to the ground and tries to persuade McGinnis to cut a deal and let her go. When McGinnis refuses Jack suddenly drops to the ground, pulls his gun out from the back of his jeans and uses his one remaining shot to shoot McGinnis in the head.

The title is also a pun, since a one shot also means that the comic is a stand-alone story.

Tying in with the TV series

Characters

Jack Bauer is not the only character to feature in both the comic and first season of 24. Richard Walsh, Nina Myers, Tony Almeida, Milo Pressman, and Jamey Farrell all appear in the same roles they have in Season 1. However Jack has taken on the role of Special Agent-In-Charge by the time of the TV series.

References

The story shows Nina Myers betraying the American government by releasing information about Moira's whereabouts to Donovan and information about Jack to her employers in Germany. She is uncovered as a traitor in the final episode of Season 1. A reference to George Mason, who features in the first two seasons of the TV series, is made when Jack is forced to take a motorbike from a civilian and leaves him a note which reads "I.O.U $500, George Mason, CTU Los Angeles"

Real-time

24: One Shot attempts to replicate the real-time nature of the TV series. There are 48 pages of comic strip with every two pages depicting approximately an hour of the story such as to tell the story of a whole day in the graphic novel (from 10am to 10am the following day). The idea of every two pages depicting an hour was not replicated in the two other graphic novels — although both depict a whole day.

Inconsistencies

24: One Shot was written before the airing of Season 5 of 24 and the introduction of Christopher Henderson raises possible contradictions between the TV series and the graphic novel. The TV series tells of Christopher Henderson having recruited Jack to CTU. However Henderson makes no appearance in 24: One Shot which gives the impression of Walsh having recruited Jack (particularly when he tells Walsh to give him a raise near the end of the novel). However the graphic novel does not say Henderson isn't holding a role at the time and doesn't indicate who is Special Agent-In-Charge at the time which would have been Henderson's role. As such the timeline ties in with the one indicated in seasons 1 and 5 that indicate Jack busted Henderson for taking a bribe about a year before the events of season 1.

External links
 Vaughn and Haynes bring "24's" Jack Bauer to comics in "24: One Shot", Comic Book Resources, April 16, 2004

2004 books
2004 comics debuts
2004 graphic novels
24 (TV series)
American graphic novels
Comics based on television series
IDW Publishing titles
Titan Books titles